Teenage Superstars is a 2017 film about the Glasgow independent music scene between 1982 and 1992, focusing on the bands that emerged from in and around the city at this point including The Pastels, BMX Bandits, The Soup Dragons, Teenage Fanclub, The Vaselines, The Jesus and Mary Chain and Primal Scream. In doing so, the film also considers the early days of Creation Records and Stephen Pastel, David Keegan and Sandy McLean’s 53rd & 3rd record label. The film follows on chronologically from 2015's Big Gold Dream, also directed by Grant McPhee, with its title taken from The Vaselines song "Teenage Superstars".

Overview 

Teenage Superstars charts a generation of musicians from Glasgow and Lanarkshire from 1982. Broadly speaking, it is chronologically structured, while also tracing the geographical and social connections between some of the bands (for example, the childhood friendship of Sean Dickson, Duglas T. Stewart and Norman Blake, all from Bellshill). The film's story follows the formation of the featured bands, the friendships between them and sharing of band members, the commercial success of The Soup Dragons, Primal Scream and Teenage Fanclub, and the bond between the Scottish and US indie scenes of the early 1990s before the scene they had created gave way to Britpop.

Production 

McPhee had originally planned to make a single film - titled The Sound of Young Scotland - about Postcard Records and The Fire Engines, but as production continued, found that "a fuller story was beginning to emerge," and that the story of the Glaswegian scene from 1982, while a continuation of Big Gold Dream, was a story in its own right "which warranted a film in itself."

Release 

Teenage Superstars premiered on 22 June 2017 at the Edinburgh International Film Festival, where it was nominated for the Audience Award and Best Documentary, going on to show at Raindance in September of that year. The film is due for a cinematic release in 2018.

Reception 
Teenage Superstars has received generally positive reviews, including 4 out of 5 stars in both The List and The Skinny, with The Herald calling it "a real treat for music fans".

It received its cinema premiere in 2018 at the Glasgow Film Festival and was part of the National Museum of Scotland's 2018 "Rip It Up" exhibition, screening at Edinburgh's Filmhouse.

Having completed a successful festival run, the documentary was picked up by Sky Arts, receiving its television premiere on the 23 January 2021. It was highly reviewed as Pick of the Day on The Guardian, The Times and The Telegraph.

Rolling Stone included Teenage Superstars in their 10 Essential British Documentaries alongside The Beatles 'Get Back'. 

An interview only companion film, Fast Forward that covers the contemporaneous Edinburgh scene was announced in 2021

References 



Documentary films about rock music and musicians
2010s English-language films
Scottish documentary films